Man Assembly constituency of Maharashtra Vidhan Sabha is one of the constituencies located in the Satara district.

It is a part of the Madha (Lok Sabha constituency), along with five other assembly constituencies, namely  Phaltan  in the Satara district and Karmala, Madha, Sangole, Malsiras in the Solapur district

Members of Legislative Assembly
Key

Election results

2019 result

Assembly elections 2014

See also

 List of constituencies of Maharashtra Legislative Assembly
 Man

References

Assembly constituencies of Maharashtra